Leon Bates may refer to:

 Leon Bates (pianist) (born 1949), American concert pianist
 Leon Bates (labor leader) (1899–1972), African American union organizer